The Charon's Garden Wilderness Area is part of the Wichita Mountains Wildlife Refuge in southwestern Oklahoma and is managed by the US Fish & Wildlife Service. It is located to the west of Medicine Park, Oklahoma and north of Lawton, Oklahoma. It is not unusual to run into deer, buffalo, elk, longhorn, and prairie dogs. Day use and limited backcountry camping is allowed with a permit from the Refuge. The area is popular with rock climbers, with formations such as Echo Dome and Crab Eyes being popular destinations.

References

External links
 
 Splinter, Dale K. and Marston, Richard A.: Wichita Mountains - Encyclopedia of Oklahoma History and Culture - Oklahoma Historical Society
 O'Dell, Larry: Wichita Mountains National Wildlife Refuge - Encyclopedia of Oklahoma History and Culture - Oklahoma Historical Society

Protected areas of Comanche County, Oklahoma
Wilderness areas of Oklahoma